Robert Alan Gross (born Bridgeport, Connecticut) is an American historian, and is an emeritus faculty member at the University of Connecticut.

Life
Gross graduated from the University of Pennsylvania in 1966, and from Columbia University with an M.A. in 1968 and a Ph.D. in 1976. He taught at Amherst College from 1976 to 1988, the University of Sussex from 1981 to 1983 and the College of William and Mary from 1988 to 2003. He was the James L. and Shirley A. Draper Professor of Early American History at the University of Connecticut.

He has written on such themes as multiculturalism and transnationalism in American thought and life.

His work appeared in Newsweek, Harper's, Saturday Review, and Book World.

Awards
 1977 Bancroft Prize
 1979 Guggenheim Fellowship
 Howard Fellowship
 Rockefeller Foundations Fellowship
 National Endowment for the Humanities grant
 American Antiquarian Society grant

Works
 The Minutemen and Their World (1976) (reprint Hill and Wang, 2001)

References

Writers from Bridgeport, Connecticut
University of Connecticut faculty
University of Pennsylvania alumni
Columbia University alumni
Amherst College faculty
College of William & Mary faculty
Academics of the University of Sussex
Living people
20th-century American historians
21st-century American historians
American male non-fiction writers
Year of birth missing (living people)
Bancroft Prize winners
Historians from Connecticut